Shimei ( Šīmʿī) is the name of a number of persons referenced in the Hebrew Bible and Rabbinical literature.
The second son of Gershon and grandson of Levi.

A Benjamite of Bahurim, son of Gera, "a man of the family of the house of Saul". He is mentioned as one of David's tormentors during his flight before Absalom, and as imploring and winning David's forgiveness when the latter returned. David, however, in his dying charge to Solomon, bade him avenge the insult. Jewish scribes say that Solomon's teacher was Shimei (son of Gera), and while he lived, he prevented Solomon from marrying foreign wives. The Talmud says at Ber. 8a: "For as long as Shimei the son of Gera was alive Solomon did not marry the daughter of Pharaoh" (see also Midrash Tehillim to Ps. 3:1). Solomon's execution of Shimei was his first descent into sin.
A brother of David, called also Shammah, Shimeah, and Shimea
A friend of King David mentioned in 
Son of Elah, one of Solomon's prefects, over the district of Benjamin
A grandson of Jeconiah and brother of Zerubbabel
A grandson of Simeon, who is described as the father of sixteen sons and six daughters, and whose clan dwelt in Judea
A Reubenite
Levites
A Benjamite chief who had nine sons (R. V.; comp. ib. v. 13)
"The Ramathite," one of David's officers
A Levite and other Israelites whom Ezra required to put away their foreign wives
Grandfather of Mordecai.

Family tree

References

Biblical murder victims
Male murder victims
Book of Exodus people
Tribe of Levi
Tribe of Reuben
Tribe of Simeon
House of Saul